The mourning warbler (Geothlypis philadelphia) is a small songbird of the New World warbler family. Mourning warblers are native to eastern and central North America as well as some countries in Central America. They are neotropical migrants and tend to be found in dense second growth forests. They are under the Wood-warbler category, which consists of arboreal and terrestrial colorful passerines. Wood warblers are in the order Passeriformes, which are perching birds including more than half of all bird species, and the family Parulidae which also includes the Common Yellowthroat, Black and White Warbler, Nashville Warbler, ovenbird, and American Redstart. They are very similar to the MacGillivray's Warbler in appearance, especially in females and immature birds, but their breeding range does not overlap into the west.

The "mourning" in this bird's name refers to the male's hood, thought to resemble a mourning veil.

Identification
Mourning warblers are small songbird with yellow underparts, olive-green upperparts, a thin pointed bill and pink legs. Adult males have a gray hood, black lores and a black patch on the throat and breast. In the fall, this pattern becomes less bright and harder to distinguish from similar species; however they never have a broken eye ring. Females and immatures are gray-brown on the head with an incomplete eye-ring. They have a yellow-gray throat with a brown or olive tint to their breast. Both sexes can range from 10–15 cm (3.9-5.9 in) in length and 11-13 g (0.4-0.5 oz) in weight. Their wingspan is 18 cm (7.1 in). Other than the MacGillivray’s Warbler, similar species include the Connecticut warblers which have a complete eye ring, not to be confused with a broken eye ring seen on immature Mourning warblers. Immature Connecticut warblers also have a whiter chest compared to the yellow chest on immature Mourning warblers. Nashville warblers are also commonly confused; however they have a yellow throat unlike the black or grey throats of Mourning warblers, females have a grey back, and they are smaller and less active than Mourning warblers.

Distribution and habitat 
Mourning warblers have breeding ground in southern Canada, and are commonly seen during migration in the central and eastern United States, Belieze, Bonaire, Puerto Rico, Guatemala, Panama, and other Central American Islands. These birds migrate to Central America and northern South America. Mourning warblers are low or ground nesters, and prefer disturbed forests with a thick under-story and covered canopy. In the winter they prefer wet lowland habitat with dense vegetation.

Behavior and ecology

Diet 
Mourning warblers forage low in vegetation, sometimes catching insects in flight. These birds mainly eat insects, also some plant material including fruiting bodies from the Cecropia tree in winter. Their diet is not well documented but also includes insect larvae and spiders that they pick from the branches of shrubs. They are also known to remove the legs and wings of the insects before consuming.

Breeding 
Mourning warblers breed in southern Canada. Their breeding habitat is thickets and semi-open areas with dense shrubs across Canada east of the Rockies and the northeastern United States. The nest is an open cup placed on the ground in a well-concealed location under thick shrubs or other vegetation. Their nest is usually made out of grass, leaves and bark and lined with roots or other thin material.

Mourning warblers typically lay 2-5 eggs, which are white or speckled brown and black in appearance. Incubation is 12 days long and both adult males and females utilize a distraction technique of pretending to have broken wings to distract predators from their nest. Mourning warblers have young with gray tufts on their head and red mouths. Adult females are also known consume their eggs after their young hatch. The number of days for young to fledge is 7–9.

Vocalization 

The song of this bird is a bright repetitive warble. The warble consists of rolling phrases that sound that typically lower in volume at the end and can sound like "chirry, chirry, chirry, chorry, chorry." The call is a sharp chip. There are usually two different pitched calls, with one higher than the harsh chip.

Conservation 
According to the North American Breeding Bird Survey, Mourning Warbler populations have declined by about 43% in the last 50 years. However, they are still categorized as a species of least concern with 17 million estimated as a global breeding population by Partners in Flight. As they have a preference for disturbed forests, they may be benefitting from human development that may be negatively effecting the habitats of other bird species.

References

External links

 Mourning warbler Species Account - Cornell Lab of Ornithology
 Mourning warbler - Oporornis philadelphia - USGS Patuxent Bird Identification InfoCenter
 
 

}
mourning warbler
Birds of Canada
Native birds of the Northeastern United States
mourning warbler
Taxa named by Alexander Wilson (ornithologist)